Mickey Goulet (born September 13, 1947) was the head coach for the Italian Olympic team (2005–2008).

Goulet is the former head coach of the University of Ottawa Gee-Gee's. The 2002-03 season was the final season for Mickey Goulet at the University of Ottawa, after spending fourteen years behind the Gee-Gees’ bench.

Currently is the head coach of the Italian Under 20 and Under 18 National team as well as the Minor Midget Ottawa Senators AAA team.

References
 
 Gee-Gee Hockey History

1947 births
Living people
Canadian ice hockey coaches
New Hampshire Wildcats men's ice hockey players